Myrne is an urban-type settlement in Volnovakha Raion (district) in Donetsk Oblast of eastern Ukraine. Population:

Demographics
Native language as of the Ukrainian Census of 2001:
 Ukrainian 18.19%
 Russian 81.4%
 Belarusian 0.05%

References

Urban-type settlements in Volnovakha Raion